Leucos aula is a species of freshwater fish in the family Cyprinidae. It is native to the Adriatic basin in southern Europe, originally occurring in Italy, Slovenia, Croatia, and Switzerland.  It has been introduced to other parts of Italy. This is an abundant fish, occurring in canals, swamps, lakes, and streams with slow current and dense vegetation.

References

Leucos
Fish described in 1841
Taxa named by Charles Lucien Bonaparte